The 2021 College Football All-America Team includes those players of American college football who have been honored by various selector organizations as the best players at their respective positions.  The selector organizations award the "All-America" honor annually following the conclusion of the fall college football season.  The original All-America team was the 1889 College Football All-America Team selected by Caspar Whitney and Walter Camp. The National Collegiate Athletic Bureau, which is the National Collegiate Athletic Association's (NCAA) service bureau, compiled, in the 1950, the first list of All-Americans including first-team selections on teams created for a national audience that received national circulation with the intent of recognizing selections made from viewpoints that were nationwide.  Since 1957, College Sports Information Directors of America (CoSIDA) has bestowed Academic All-American recognition on male and female athletes in Divisions I, II, and III of the NCAA as well as National Association of Intercollegiate Athletics athletes, including all NCAA championship sports.

The 2021 College Football All-America Team is composed of the following College Football All-American first teams chosen by the following selector organizations: Associated Press (AP), Football Writers Association of America (FWAA), American Football Coaches Association (AFCA), Walter Camp Foundation (WCFF), Sporting News (TSN, from its historic name of The Sporting News), Sports Illustrated (SI), The Athletic (Athletic), USA Today (USAT), ESPN, CBS Sports (CBS), College Football News (CFN), Scout.com, Athlon Sports, Phil Steele, and Fox Sports (FOX).

Currently, the NCAA compiles consensus all-America teams in the sports of Division I FBS football and Division I men's basketball using a point system computed from All-America teams named by coaches associations or media sources.  Players are chosen against other players playing at their position only.  To be selected a consensus All-American, players must be chosen to the first team on at least half of the five official selectors as recognized by the NCAA.  Second- and third-team honors are used to break ties.  Players named first-team by all five selectors are deemed unanimous All-Americans. Currently, the NCAA recognizes All-Americans selected by the AP, AFCA, FWAA, TSN, and the WCFF to determine consensus and unanimous All-Americans.

Twenty-seven players were recognized as consensus All-Americans for 2021, ten of them unanimously. Unanimous selections are followed by an asterisk (*).

Offense

Quarterback
Bryce Young, Alabama (AP, CBS, ESPN, FWAA, The Athletic, TSN, USAT)
Kenny Pickett, Pittsburgh (AFCA, WCFF)

Running back
Breece Hall, Iowa State (AFCA, AP, CBS, The Athletic, USAT, TSN, WCFF)
Sean Tucker, Syracuse (ESPN, FWAA)
Kenneth Walker III, Michigan State (AFCA, AP, CBS, ESPN, FWAA, The Athletic, TSN, USAT, WCFF)

Wide receiver
Jordan Addison, Pittsburgh  (AP, ESPN, FWAA, TSN, USAT, WCFF)
David Bell, Purdue (AFCA, AP, CBS, ESPN, FWAA, WCFF)
Chris Olave, Ohio State (AFCA)
Jameson Williams, Alabama (AP, CBS, The Athletic, TSN, USAT)
Garrett Wilson, Ohio State (FWAA, The Athletic)

Tight end
Brock Bowers, Georgia (CBS, ESPN, The Athletic, USAT)
Trey McBride, Colorado State (AFCA, AP, FWAA, TSN, WCFF)

Offensive line
Charles Cross, Mississippi State (ESPN, TSN)
Connor Galvin, Baylor (The Athletic)
Kenyon Green, Texas A&M (AP, ESPN, The Athletic, TSN, USAT)
Zion Johnson, Boston College (AP, ESPN, USAT, WCFF)
Darian Kinnard, Kentucky (AFCA, AP, CBS, FWAA, WCFF)
Tyler Linderbaum, Iowa (AFCA, AP, CBS, ESPN, FWAA, The Athletic, USAT, TSN, WCFF)
Thayer Munford, Ohio State (AFCA)
Evan Neal, Alabama (AFCA, CBS, ESPN, FWAA, The Athletic, TSN, USAT, WCFF)
Ikem Ekwonu, NC State (AFCA, AP, CBS, FWAA, The Athletic, TSN, USAT, WCFF)
Nicholas Petit-Frere, Ohio State (CBS, FWAA)

Defense

Defensive line
Jordan Davis, Georgia (AFCA, AP, CBS, ESPN, FWAA, The Athletic, TSN, USAT, WCFF)
Aidan Hutchinson, Michigan (AFCA, AP, CBS, ESPN, FWAA, The Athletic, TSN, USAT, WCFF)
Jermaine Johnson II, Florida State (CBS, ESPN, USAT, WCFF)
George Karlaftis, Purdue (AFCA)
DeMarvin Leal, Texas A&M (AP, CBS, TSN, USAT)
Will McDonald IV, Iowa State (FWAA)
Kayvon Thibodeaux, Oregon (AFCA, AP, FWAA, The Athletic, TSN, WCFF)
Cameron Thomas, San Diego State (ESPN, The Athletic)

Linebacker
Will Anderson Jr., Alabama (AFCA, AP, CBS, ESPN, FWAA, The Athletic, TSN, USAT, WCFF)
Leo Chenal, Wisconsin (AFCA)
Nakobe Dean, Georgia (AFCA, AP, CBS, ESPN, FWAA, The Athletic, TSN, USAT, WCFF)
Devin Lloyd, Utah (AP, CBS, ESPN, FWAA, The Athletic, TSN, USAT, WCFF)
Malcolm Rodriguez, Oklahoma State (ESPN)

Defensive back
Jaquan Brisker, Penn State (CBS)
Coby Bryant, Cincinnati (AFCA, WCFF)
Lewis Cine, Georgia (TSN)
Sauce Gardner, Cincinnati (AFCA, AP, CBS, ESPN, FWAA, The Athletic, TSN, USAT)
Kyle Hamilton, Notre Dame (AFCA, FWAA, The Athletic, WCFF)
Marcus Jones, Houston (AP)
Steven Jones Jr., Appalachian State (FWAA)
Roger McCreary, Auburn (AP, ESPN, The Athletic, USAT)
Verone McKinley III, Oregon (AP, CBS, ESPN, TSN, USAT, WCFF)
Riley Moss, Iowa (CBS, TSN)
Jalen Pitre, Baylor (AFCA, AP, ESPN, FWAA, The Athletic, USAT, WCFF)

Special teams

Kicker
Harrison Mevis, Missouri (The Athletic, TSN)
Jake Moody, Michigan (AFCA, AP, CBS, WCFF)
Nate Needham, Bowling Green (FWAA)
Noah Ruggles, Ohio State (ESPN)
Caleb Shudak, Iowa (USAT)

Punter
Matt Araiza, San Diego State (AFCA, AP, CBS, ESPN, FWAA, The Athletic, TSN, USAT, WCFF)

Long snapper
Cal Adomitis, Pittsburgh (AFCA)

All-purpose / return specialist
Brian Battie, South Florida (FWAA, WCFF)
Britain Covey, Utah (CBS)
Marcus Jones, Houston (CBS, ESPN, FWAA, The Athletic, TSN, USAT)
Zonovan Knight, NC State (CBS)
Jayden Reed, Michigan State (AFCA)
Deuce Vaughn, Kansas State (AP, TSN)
Jameson Williams, Alabama (ESPN)

Footnotes

References
American Football Coaches Association All-America Team
Associated Press All-America Team
CBS Sports All-America Team
ESPN All-America Team
Football Writers Association of America All-America Team
The Athletic All-America Team
The Sporting News 2021 College Football All-America Team
USA Today All-America Team
Walter Camp Football Foundation All-America Team

All-America Team
College Football All-America Teams